The following is the qualification system and qualified athletes for the Surfing at the 2023 Pan American Games competitions.

Qualification
A total of 88 surfers will qualify across various qualification tournaments. The host nation Chile, will be automatically be allocated ten quota spots across the eight events. In the shortboard category, a country can enter two athletes, with a maximum one in all other categories. A country can enter a maximum ten surfers (five per gender). An athlete can only qualify one quota for their country.

Qualification timeline

Qualification summary
The following is the qualification summary.

Men

Shortboard

SUP surf

SUP race

Longboard

Women

Shortboard

SUP surf

SUP race

Longboard

References

P
P
Qualification for the 2023 Pan American Games